Westinghouse Desilu Playhouse is an American television anthology series produced by Desilu Productions. The show ran on the Columbia Broadcasting System between 1958 and 1960. Three of its 48 episodes served as pilots for the 1950s television series The Twilight Zone (One Episode) and The Untouchables (Two Episodes).

History
Between 1951 and 1957, Desi Arnaz (1917-1986) and Lucille Ball (1911-1989) starred in and produced (via their Desilu production company) the immensely popular I Love Lucy show. In early 1958, Desi Arnaz convinced CBS to purchase Desilu Playhouse with the promise that a bi-monthly Lucille Ball-Desi Arnaz Show (later rebroadcast as The Lucy-Desi Comedy Hour) would be among the dramas, comedies and musicals planned for the show. Westinghouse Electric Company paid a then-record $12 million to sponsor the show, which resulted in the cancellation of the prestigious anthology series Studio One, also sponsored by Westinghouse.

The show debuted on Monday nights in the 10:00–11:00 pm [Eastern Standard Time] evening time slot on October 6, 1958, hosted by Desi Arnaz, with Betty Furness continuing as the Westinghouse spokesperson (as she had been on Studio One). The first show was "Lucy Goes to Mexico," a Lucy-Desi Hour with guest star Maurice Chevalier. The dramatic "Bernadette" (a biography of the Roman Catholic Church's Saint Bernadette), starring Pier Angeli, premiered in week two. Later shows included comedies, dramas and musicals, and various one-off comedies and dramas starring Lucille Ball in non-"Lucy" character performances.

In October 1959, the show moved to Friday nights from 9:00–10:00 pm [Eastern Standard Time]. The show lasted only one more year, due to an inability to attract big guest stars, the growing popularity then of westerns and police shows being shown on prime time. It ran opposite the competing ABC television network's highly rated 77 Sunset Strip that season, and the Arnaz-Ball divorce in 1960. Just prior to their marital breakup, Ball and Arnaz, along with Vivian Vance, William Frawley, and Little Ricky, filmed the last Lucille Ball-Desi Arnaz Show, entitled "Lucy Meets The Moustache" and featuring guest stars Ernie Kovacs and Edie Adams. This last hour-long installment of the I Love Lucy format and characters was broadcast on April 1, 1960. The final telecast of The Westinghouse Desilu Playhouse, "Murder is a Private Affair", aired on June 10, 1960.

Notable episodes

In the fall of 1958, "The Time Element". starring William Bendix, aired to positive reviews. Written by Rod Serling, the show's popularity gave Serling the leverage to convince CBS to give the go-ahead to Serling's concept for a science fiction/fantasy anthology series (which was what Serling had in mind when writing "The Time Element") that he called The Twilight Zone which debuted in the fall of 1959.

In April 1959, Desilu Playhouse aired a two-part drama called "The Untouchables". Paul Monash adapted the 1957 memoirs of treasury agent Eliot Ness, played by Robert Stack. After CBS passed on the idea to produce a weekly version, The Untouchables became a hit series on ABC and ran for four seasons (1959–1963).  Stack was selected only after the agent of Arnaz' personal choice, actor Van Johnson, demanded Johnson be paid for 2 episodes at $10,000 each (the normal rate). Arnaz, according to Stack, blew his top at Johnson, fired him and called Stack and offered him the role.  Stack accepted at once and began filming the next day

Production notes

Music
Music for the show was composed by John Waldo "Johnny" Green. The show opened with "Westinghouse Logo" and closed with "Desilu Playhouse Closing Theme" during the end credits.

Notable crew members
Several notable people contributed to one or more episodes of the show, including (in alphabetical order):

Producers

Bert Granet
Quinn Martin

Directors

Robert Florey
Claudio Guzmán
Douglas Heyes
Arthur Hiller
Jerry Hopper
Lamont Johnson
Phil Karlson
Buzz Kulik
Robert Ellis Miller
Ralph Nelson
Joseph M. Newman
Ted Post
Jerry Thorpe

Writers

James B. Allardice
Madelyn Davis
Oscar Fraley
John Mantley
Eliot Ness
Rod Serling
William Templeton

Actors

Desi Arnaz
Lucille Ball
Jane Russell
Martin Balsam
Parley Baer
John Drew Barrymore
Richard Benedict
John Beradino
Warren Berlinger
Neville Brand
Rory Calhoun
Wally Cassell
Pat Crowley
Frank DeKova
Buddy Ebsen
Abel Fernandez
Wallace Ford
William Frawley
Betty Furness
Bruce Gordon
Jean Hagen
Donald Harron
Earl Holliman
Vivi Janiss
Richard Keith
Barton MacLane
Joe Mantell
Margo
John McIntire
Sid Melton
Martin Milner
Cameron Mitchell
George Murphy
Barbara Nichols
Hugh O'Brian
Roger Perry
Paul Picerni
Aldo Ray
Joe De Santis
Karen Sharpe
Mickey Simpson
Red Skelton
Patricia Smith
Robert Stack
Harry Dean Stanton
Barry Sullivan
Carol Thurston
Vivian Vance
Bill Williams
Walter Winchell
James Westerfield
Jack Weston
Jesse White
James Whitmore
Ed Wynn
Keenan Wynn

Aftermath
Westinghouse bought CBS in 1995, and renamed itself after its prime asset in 1997.

Further reading
Anderson, Christopher. Hollywood TV: The Studio System in the Fifties. Austin, Texas: University of Texas Press, 1994. 
Andrew, Bart. The "I Love Lucy" Book. New York: Doubleday, 1985. 
Sanders, Coyness Steven, and Tom Gilbert. Desilu: The Story of Lucille Ball and Desi Arnaz. New York: William Morrow, 1993.

References

External links

 Desilu Playhouse "Silent Thunder" Complete 52min episode from 16mm film - aired Dec. 8, 1958
 Westinghouse Desilu Playhouse at CVTA with episode list

Television series by CBS Studios
Black-and-white American television shows
1950s American anthology television series
1960s American anthology television series
1958 American television series debuts
1960 American television series endings
American Broadcasting Company original programming

English-language television shows
Television series by Desilu Productions